Donald Frederick Carter (11 September 1921 – 2002) was an English professional footballer who scored 46 goals from 163 appearances in the Football League playing as an outside left or inside forward for Bury, Blackburn Rovers and New Brighton.

Life and career
Carter was born in Midsomer Norton, Somerset, in 1921. He played non-league football for Norton St John's before joining Birmingham League club Stourbridge early in the 1938–39 season. Playing at outside left, he soon attracted attention from bigger clubs, and in January 1939 signed for Bury of the Football League Second Division.

He did not make his senior debut for the club until after the Second World War, and scored 27 goals from 56 matches over two seasons. The goals included a hat-trick in a 6–3 win against Bradford Park Avenue in 1947. Carter spent a few months with Blackburn Rovers, playing twice without scoring, and then joined New Brighton in November 1948. He scored 19 goals from 105 league appearances, and left for Northwich Victoria after New Brighton finished bottom of the Third Division North and were not re-elected.

Carter died in Bath, Somerset, in 2002.

References

1921 births
2002 deaths
People from Midsomer Norton
English footballers
Association football inside forwards
Stourbridge F.C. players
Bury F.C. players
Blackburn Rovers F.C. players
New Brighton A.F.C. players
Northwich Victoria F.C. players
Rochdale A.F.C. wartime guest players
English Football League players